István Fehér (6 March 1954 – March 2021) was a Hungarian wrestler. He competed in the men's freestyle 74 kg at the 1980 Summer Olympics.

References

External links
 

1954 births
2021 deaths
Hungarian male sport wrestlers
Olympic wrestlers of Hungary
Wrestlers at the 1980 Summer Olympics
People from Nagykőrös
Sportspeople from Pest County